The New York Photo Festival was founded in January 2007 by Frank Evers and Daniel Power in an effort to establish a U.S. photo festival dedicated to the "future of contemporary photography" and to the exposure of new works. It takes place every year in mid-May over a period of four days in Dumbo, Brooklyn.

History
The inaugural event took place on May 14–18, 2008 and was attended by 15,000 people. It was curated by Martin Parr, Lesley A. Martin, Tim Barber and Kathy Ryan.

References

External links 
 New York Photo Festival official website
 New York Photo Festival Plans Expansion in 2009
 New York Photo Festival 2008: Art in Review | New York Times

Photography festivals
Festivals in New York City
Art festivals in the United States